The 56th United States Congress was a meeting of the legislative branch of the United States federal government, composed of the United States Senate and the United States House of Representatives. It met in Washington, D.C. from March 4, 1899, to March 4, 1901, during the third and fourth years of William McKinley's presidency. The apportionment of seats in this House of Representatives was based on the 1890 United States census. Both chambers had a Republican majority. There was one African-American member, George Henry White of North Carolina, who served his second and final term as a representative in this Congress, and would be the last black member of Congress until 1928, and the last black member of Congress from the South until 1972.

Major events

 June 2, 1899: The Filipino Rebellion began the Philippine–American War.
 November 21, 1899: Vice President Garret Hobart died.
 January 8, 1900: President McKinley placed Alaska under military rule. 
 January 17, 1900: Brigham H. Roberts was refused a seat in the United States House of Representatives because of his polygamy.
 February 5, 1900: Britain and the United States signed a treaty for the building of a Central American shipping canal through Nicaragua.
 February 16, 1900: The United States, Germany and Great Britain ratified the Tripartite Convention partitioning the Samoan Islands.
 November 6, 1900: U.S. presidential election, 1900: Republican incumbent William McKinley was reelected by defeating Democratic challenger William Jennings Bryan.

Major legislation 

 March 14, 1900: Gold Standard Act, Sess. 1, ch. 41, 
 April 2, 1900: Foraker Act, Sess. 1, ch. 191,  (Puerto Rico Civil Code)

Territory organized
 April 30, 1900: Hawaii Territory was organized, Sess. 1, ch. 339,

Party summary  
The count below identifies party affiliations at the beginning of the first session of this Congress, and includes members from vacancies and newly admitted states, when they were first seated. Changes resulting from subsequent replacements are shown below in the "Changes in membership" section.

Senate

House of Representatives

Leadership

Senate 
 President: Garret Hobart (R), until November 21, 1899; vacant thereafter.
 President pro tempore: William P. Frye (R)
 Democratic Caucus Chairman: James K. Jones 
 Republican Conference Chairman: William B. Allison 
 Democratic Campaign Committee Chairman: Stephen M. White

House of Representatives 
 Speaker: David B. Henderson (R)
 Democratic Caucus Chairman: James Hay 
 Republican Conference Chairman: Joseph G. Cannon
 Republican Campaign Committee Chairman: Joseph W. Babcock

Majority (Republican) leadership
Majority Leader: Sereno E. Payne
Majority Whip: James A. Tawney

Minority (Democratic) leadership
Minority Leader: James D. Richardson
Minority Whip: Oscar Underwood

Members 
This list is arranged by chamber, then by state. Senators are listed by class, and representatives are listed by district.
Skip to House of Representatives, below

Senate
At this time, Senators were elected by the state legislatures every two years, with one-third beginning new six-year terms with each Congress. Preceding the names in the list below are Senate class numbers, which indicate the cycle of their election. In this Congress, Class 1 meant their term began with this Congress, requiring re-election in 1904; Class 2 meant their term ended with this Congress, requiring re-election in 1900; and Class 3 meant their term began in the last Congress, requiring re-election in 1902.

Alabama 
 2. John T. Morgan (D)
 3. Edmund W. Pettus (D)

Arkansas 
 2. James H. Berry (D)
 3. James K. Jones (D)

California 
 1. Thomas R. Bard (R), from February 7, 1900
 3. George C. Perkins (R)

Colorado 
 2. Edward O. Wolcott (R)
 3. Henry M. Teller (SR)

Connecticut 
 1. Joseph R. Hawley (R)
 3. Orville H. Platt (R)

Delaware 
 1. vacant
 2. Richard R. Kenney (D)

Florida 
 1. Samuel Pasco (D), until April 18, 1899
 James Taliaferro (D), from April 19, 1899
 3. Stephen R. Mallory (D)

Georgia 
 2. Augustus O. Bacon (D)
 3. Alexander S. Clay (D)

Idaho 
 2. George L. Shoup (R)
 3. Henry Heitfeld (P)

Illinois 
 2. Shelby M. Cullom (R)
 3. William E. Mason (R)

Indiana 
 1. Albert J. Beveridge (R)
 3. Charles W. Fairbanks (R)

Iowa 
 2. John H. Gear (R), until July 14, 1900
 Jonathan P. Dolliver (R), from August 22, 1900
 3. William B. Allison (R)

Kansas 
 2. Lucien Baker (R)
 3. William A. Harris (P)

Kentucky 
 2. William Lindsay (D)
 3. William J. Deboe (R)

Louisiana 
 2. Donelson Caffery (D)
 3. Samuel D. McEnery (D)

Maine 
 1. Eugene Hale (R)
 2. William P. Frye (R)

Maryland 
 1. Louis E. McComas (R)
 3. George L. Wellington (R)

Massachusetts 
 1. Henry Cabot Lodge (R)
 2. George F. Hoar (R)

Michigan 
 1. Julius C. Burrows (R)
 2. James McMillan (R)

Minnesota 
 1. Cushman K. Davis (R), until November 27, 1900
 Charles A. Towne (D), December 5, 1900 – January 23, 1901
 Moses E. Clapp (R), from January 23, 1901
 2. Knute Nelson (R)

Mississippi 
 1. Hernando D. Money (D)
 2. William V. Sullivan (D)

Missouri 
 1. Francis M. Cockrell (D)
 3. George G. Vest (D)

Montana 
 1. William A. Clark (D), until May 15, 1900
 2. Thomas H. Carter (R)

Nebraska 
 1. Monroe L. Hayward (R), March 8, 1899 – December 5, 1899
 William V. Allen (P), from December 13, 1899
 2. John M. Thurston (R)

Nevada 
 1. William M. Stewart (S)
 3. John P. Jones (S)

New Hampshire 
 2. William E. Chandler (R)
 3. Jacob H. Gallinger (R)

New Jersey 
 1. John Kean (R)
 2. William J. Sewell (R)

New York 
 1. Chauncey M. Depew (R)
 3. Thomas C. Platt (R)

North Carolina 
 2. Marion Butler (P)
 3. Jeter C. Pritchard (R)

North Dakota 
 1. Porter J. McCumber (R)
 3. Henry C. Hansbrough (R)

Ohio 
 1. Marcus A. Hanna (R)
 3. Joseph B. Foraker (R)

Oregon 
 2. George W. McBride (R)
 3. Joseph Simon (R)

Pennsylvania 
 1. Matthew S. Quay (R), from January 16, 1901
 3. Boies Penrose (R)

Rhode Island 
 1. Nelson W. Aldrich (R)
 2. George P. Wetmore (R)

South Carolina 
 2. Benjamin R. Tillman (D)
 3. John L. McLaurin (D)

South Dakota 
 2. Richard F. Pettigrew (SR)
 3. James H. Kyle (P)

Tennessee 
 1. William B. Bate (D)
 2. Thomas B. Turley (D)

Texas 
 1. Charles A. Culberson (D)
 2. Horace Chilton (D)

Utah 
 1. Thomas Kearns (R), from January 23, 1901
 3. Joseph L. Rawlins (D)

Vermont 
 1. Redfield Proctor (R)
 3. Jonathan Ross (R), until October 18, 1900
 William P. Dillingham (R), from October 18, 1900

Virginia 
 1. John W. Daniel (D)
 2. Thomas S. Martin (D)

Washington 
 1. Addison G. Foster (R)
 3. George Turner (SR)

West Virginia 
 1. Nathan B. Scott (R)
 2. Stephen B. Elkins (R)

Wisconsin 
 1. Joseph V. Quarles (R)
 3. John C. Spooner (R)

Wyoming 
 1. Clarence D. Clark (R)
 2. Francis E. Warren (R)

House of Representatives

Alabama 
 . George W. Taylor (D)
 . Jesse F. Stallings (D)
 . Henry D. Clayton (D)
 . Gaston A. Robbins (D), until March 8, 1900
 William F. Aldrich (R), from March 8, 1900
 . Willis Brewer (D)
 . John H. Bankhead (D)
 . John L. Burnett (D)
 . Joseph Wheeler (D), until April 20, 1900
 William N. Richardson (D), from December 3, 1900
 . Oscar Underwood (D)

Arkansas 
 . Philip D. McCulloch Jr. (D)
 . John S. Little (D)
 . Thomas C. McRae (D)
 . William L. Terry (D)
 . Hugh A. Dinsmore (D)
 . Stephen Brundidge Jr. (D)

California 
 . John A. Barham (R)
 . Marion De Vries (D), until August 20, 1900
 Samuel D. Woods (R), from December 3, 1900
 . Victor H. Metcalf (R)
 . Julius Kahn (R)
 . Eugene F. Loud (R)
 . Russell J. Waters (R)
 . James C. Needham (R)

Colorado 
 . John F. Shafroth (SR)
 . John C. Bell (P)

Connecticut 
 . E. Stevens Henry (R)
 . Nehemiah D. Sperry (R)
 . Charles A. Russell (R)
 . Ebenezer J. Hill (R)

Delaware 
 . John H. Hoffecker (R), until June 16, 1900
 Walter O. Hoffecker (R), from November 6, 1900

Florida 
 . Stephen M. Sparkman (D)
 . Robert W. Davis (D)

Georgia 
 . Rufus E. Lester (D)
 . James M. Griggs (D)
 . Elijah B. Lewis (D)
 . William C. Adamson (D)
 . Leonidas F. Livingston (D)
 . Charles L. Bartlett (D)
 . John W. Maddox (D)
 . William M. Howard (D)
 . Farish C. Tate (D)
 . William H. Fleming (D)
 . William G. Brantley (D)

Idaho 
 . Edgar Wilson (SR)

Illinois 
 . James R. Mann (R)
 . William Lorimer (R)
 . George P. Foster (D)
 . Thomas Cusack (D)
 . Edward T. Noonan (D)
 . Henry S. Boutell (R)
 . George E. Foss (R)
 . Albert J. Hopkins (R)
 . Robert R. Hitt (R)
 . George W. Prince (R)
 . Walter Reeves (R)
 . Joseph G. Cannon (R)
 . Vespasian Warner (R)
 . Joseph V. Graff (R)
 . Benjamin F. Marsh (R)
 . William E. Williams (D)
 . Ben F. Caldwell (D)
 . Thomas M. Jett (D)
 . Joseph B. Crowley (D)
 . James R. Williams (D)
 . William A. Rodenberg (R)
 . George Washington Smith (R)

Indiana 
 . James A. Hemenway (R)
 . Robert W. Miers (D)
 . William T. Zenor (D)
 . Francis M. Griffith (D)
 . George W. Faris (R)
 . James E. Watson (R)
 . Jesse Overstreet (R)
 . George W. Cromer (R)
 . Charles B. Landis (R)
 . Edgar D. Crumpacker (R)
 . George W. Steele (R)
 . James M. Robinson (D)
 . Abraham L. Brick (R)

Iowa 
 . Thomas Hedge (R)
 . Joseph R. Lane (R)
 . David B. Henderson (R)
 . Gilbert N. Haugen (R)
 . Robert G. Cousins (R)
 . John F. Lacey (R)
 . John A. T. Hull (R)
 . William P. Hepburn (R)
 . Smith McPherson (R), until June 6, 1900
 Walter I. Smith (R), from December 3, 1900
 . Jonathan P. Dolliver (R), until August 22, 1900
 James P. Conner (R), from December 4, 1900
 . Lot Thomas (R)

Kansas 
 . Charles Curtis (R)
 . Justin De Witt Bowersock (R)
 . Edwin R. Ridgely (P)
 . James Monroe Miller (R)
 . William A. Calderhead (R)
 . William A. Reeder (R)
 . Chester I. Long (R)
 . Willis Joshua Bailey (R)

Kentucky 
 . Charles K. Wheeler (D)
 . Henry Dixon Allen (D)
 . John S. Rhea (D)
 . David Highbaugh Smith (D)
 . Oscar Turner (D)
 . Albert S. Berry (D)
 . Evan E. Settle (D), until November 16, 1899
 June Ward Gayle (D), from January 15, 1900
 . George G. Gilbert (D)
 . Samuel J. Pugh (R)
 . Thomas Y. Fitzpatrick (D)
 . Vincent Boreing (R)

Louisiana 
 . Adolph Meyer (D)
 . Robert C. Davey (D)
 . Robert F. Broussard (D)
 . Phanor Breazeale (D)
 . Samuel T. Baird (D), until April 22, 1899
 Joseph E. Ransdell (D), from August 29, 1899
 . Samuel M. Robertson (D)

Maine 
 . Thomas B. Reed (R), until September 4, 1899
 Amos L. Allen (R), from November 6, 1899
 . Charles E. Littlefield (R), from June 19, 1899
 . Edwin C. Burleigh (R)
 . Charles A. Boutelle (R), until March 3, 1901

Maryland 
 . John W. Smith (D), until January 12, 1900
 Josiah Kerr (R),  from November 6, 1900
 . William B. Baker (R)
 . Frank C. Wachter (R)
 . James W. Denny (D)
 . Sydney E. Mudd (R)
 . George A. Pearre (R)

Massachusetts 
 . George P. Lawrence (R)
 . Frederick H. Gillett (R)
 . John R. Thayer (D)
 . George W. Weymouth (R)
 . William S. Knox (R)
 . William H. Moody (R)
 . Ernest W. Roberts (R)
 . Samuel W. McCall (R)
 . John F. Fitzgerald (D)
 . Henry F. Naphen (D)
 . Charles F. Sprague (R)
 . William C. Lovering (R)
 . William S. Greene (R)

Michigan 
 . John B. Corliss (R)
 . Henry C. Smith (R)
 . Washington Gardner (R)
 . Edward L. Hamilton (R)
 . William Alden Smith (R)
 . Samuel W. Smith (R)
 . Edgar Weeks (R)
 . Joseph W. Fordney (R)
 . Roswell P. Bishop (R)
 . Rousseau O. Crump (R)
 . William S. Mesick (R)
 . Carlos D. Shelden (R)

Minnesota 
 . James Albertus Tawney (R)
 . James T. McCleary (R)
 . Joel Heatwole (R)
 . Frederick C. Stevens (R)
 . Loren Fletcher (R)
 . R. Page W. Morris (R)
 . Frank Eddy (R)

Mississippi 
 . John M. Allen (D)
 . Thomas Spight (D)
 . Thomas C. Catchings (D)
 . Andrew F. Fox (D)
 . John Sharp Williams (D)
 . Frank A. McLain (D)
 . Patrick Henry (D)

Missouri 
 . James T. Lloyd (D)
 . William W. Rucker (D)
 . John Dougherty (D)
 . Charles F. Cochran (D)
 . William S. Cowherd (D)
 . David A. De Armond (D)
 . James Cooney (D)
 . Richard P. Bland (D), until June 15, 1899
 Dorsey W. Shackleford (D), from August 29, 1899
 . James Beauchamp Clark (D)
 . Richard Bartholdt (R)
 . Charles F. Joy (R)
 . Charles E. Pearce (R)
 . Edward Robb (D)
 . Willard D. Vandiver (D)
 . Maecenas E. Benton (D)

Montana 
 . Albert J. Campbell (D)

Nebraska 
 . Elmer J. Burkett (R)
 . David H. Mercer (R)
 . John S. Robinson (D)
 . William L. Stark (P)
 . Roderick D. Sutherland (P)
 . William L. Greene (P), until March 11, 1899
 William Neville (P), from December 4, 1899

Nevada 
 . Francis G. Newlands (S)

New Hampshire 
 . Cyrus A. Sulloway (R)
 . Frank G. Clarke (R) until January 9, 1901

New Jersey 
 . Henry C. Loudenslager (R)
 . John J. Gardner (R)
 . Benjamin F. Howell (R)
 . Joshua S. Salmon (D)
 . James F. Stewart (R)
 . Richard Wayne Parker (R)
 . William D. Daly (D), until July 31, 1900
 Allan L. McDermott (D), from December 3, 1900
 . Charles N. Fowler (R)

New York 
 . Townsend Scudder (D)
 . John J. Fitzgerald (D)
 . Edmund H. Driggs (D)
 . Bertram T. Clayton (D)
 . Frank E. Wilson (D)
 . Mitchell May (D)
 . Nicholas Muller (D)
 . Daniel J. Riordan (D)
 . Thomas J. Bradley (D)
 . Amos J. Cummings (D)
 . William Sulzer (D)
 . George B. McClellan Jr. (D)
 . Jefferson M. Levy (D)
 . William A. Chanler (D)
 . Jacob Ruppert (D)
 . John Q. Underhill (D)
 . Arthur S. Tompkins (R)
 . John H. Ketcham (R)
 . Aaron V. S. Cochrane (R)
 . Martin H. Glynn (D)
 . John Knox Stewart (R)
 . Lucius N. Littauer (R)
 . Louis W. Emerson (R)
 . Charles A. Chickering (R), until February 13, 1900
 Albert D. Shaw (R), November 6, 1900 – February 10, 1901
 . James S. Sherman (R)
 . George W. Ray (R)
 . Michael E. Driscoll (R)
 . Sereno E. Payne (R)
 . Charles W. Gillet (R)
 . James W. Wadsworth (R)
 . James M. E. O'Grady (R)
 . William H. Ryan (D)
 . De Alva S. Alexander (R)
 . Edward B. Vreeland (R), from November 7, 1899

North Carolina 
 . John Humphrey Small (D)
 . George H. White (R)
 . Charles R. Thomas (D)
 . John W. Atwater (P)
 . William W. Kitchin (D)
 . John D. Bellamy (D)
 . Theodore F. Kluttz (D)
 . Romulus Z. Linney (R)
 . William T. Crawford (D), until May 10, 1900
 Richmond Pearson (R), from May 10, 1900

North Dakota 
 . Burleigh F. Spalding (R)

Ohio 
 . William B. Shattuc (R)
 . Jacob H. Bromwell (R)
 . John L. Brenner (D)
 . Robert B. Gordon (D)
 . David Meekison (D)
 . Seth W. Brown (R)
 . Walter L. Weaver (R)
 . Archibald Lybrand (R)
 . James H. Southard (R)
 . Stephen Morgan (R)
 . Charles H. Grosvenor (R)
 . John J. Lentz (D)
 . James A. Norton (D)
 . Winfield S. Kerr (R)
 . Henry C. Van Voorhis (R)
 . Lorenzo Danford (R), until June 19, 1899
 John J. Gill (R), from December 4, 1899
 . John A. McDowell (D)
 . Robert W. Tayler (R)
 . Charles W. F. Dick (R)
 . Fremont O. Phillips (R)
 . Theodore E. Burton (R)

Oregon 
 . Thomas H. Tongue (R)
 . Malcolm A. Moody (R)

Pennsylvania 
 . Henry H. Bingham (R)
 . Robert Adams Jr. (R)
 . William McAleer (D)
 . James R. Young (R)
 . Alfred C. Harmer (R), until March 6, 1900
 Edward D. Morrell (R), from November 6, 1900
 . Thomas S. Butler (R)
 . Irving P. Wanger (R)
 . Laird H. Barber (D)
 . Daniel Ermentrout (D), until September 17, 1899
 Henry D. Green (D), from November 7, 1899
 . Marriott Brosius (R)
 . William Connell (R)
 . Stanley W. Davenport (D)
 . James W. Ryan (D)
 . Marlin E. Olmsted (R)
 . Charles F. Wright (R)
 . Horace B. Packer (R)
 . Rufus K. Polk (D)
 . Thaddeus M. Mahon (R)
 . Edward D. Ziegler (D)
 . Joseph E. Thropp (R)
 . Summers M. Jack (R)
 . John Dalzell (R)
 . William H. Graham (R)
 . Ernest F. Acheson (R)
 . Joseph B. Showalter (R)
 . Athelston Gaston (D)
 . Joseph C. Sibley (D)
 . James K. P. Hall (D)
 . Samuel A. Davenport (R)
 . Galusha A. Grow (R)

Rhode Island 
 . Melville Bull (R)
 . Adin B. Capron (R)

South Carolina 
 . William Elliott (D)
 . William J. Talbert (D)
 . Asbury C. Latimer (D)
 . Stanyarne Wilson (D)
 . David E. Finley (D)
 . James Norton (D)
 . J. William Stokes (D)

South Dakota 
 . Charles H. Burke (R)
 . Robert J. Gamble (R)

Tennessee 
 . Walter P. Brownlow (R)
 . Henry R. Gibson (R)
 . John A. Moon (D)
 . Charles E. Snodgrass (D)
 . James D. Richardson (D)
 . John W. Gaines (D)
 . Nicholas N. Cox (D)
 . Thetus W. Sims (D)
 . Rice A. Pierce (D)
 . Edward W. Carmack (D)

Texas 
 . Thomas H. Ball (D)
 . Samuel B. Cooper (D)
 . Reese C. De Graffenreid (D)
 . John L. Sheppard (D)
 . Joseph W. Bailey (D)
 . Robert E. Burke (D)
 . Robert L. Henry (D)
 . Samuel W. T. Lanham (D)
 . Albert S. Burleson (D)
 . Robert B. Hawley (R)
 . Rudolph Kleberg (D)
 . James L. Slayden (D)
 . John H. Stephens (D)

Utah 
 . William H. King (D), from April 2, 1900

Vermont 
 . H. Henry Powers (R)
 . William W. Grout (R)

Virginia 
 . William A. Jones (D)
 . William A. Young (D), until March 12, 1900
 Richard A. Wise (R), March 12, 1900 – December 21, 1900
 . John Lamb (D)
 . Sydney P. Epes (D), until March 3, 1900
 Francis R. Lassiter (D), from April 19, 1900
 . Claude A. Swanson (D)
 . Peter J. Otey (D)
 . James Hay (D)
 . John F. Rixey (D)
 . William F. Rhea (D)
 . Julian M. Quarles (D)

Washington 
 . Francis W. Cushman (R)
 . Wesley L. Jones (R)

West Virginia 
 . Blackburn B. Dovener (R)
 . Alston G. Dayton (R)
 . David Emmons Johnston (D)
 . Romeo H. Freer (R)

Wisconsin 
 . Henry Allen Cooper (R)
 . Herman B. Dahle (R)
 . Joseph W. Babcock (R)
 . Theobald Otjen (R)
 . Samuel S. Barney (R)
 . James H. Davidson (R)
 . John J. Esch (R)
 . Edward S. Minor (R)
 . Alexander Stewart (R)
 . John J. Jenkins (R)

Wyoming 
 . Frank W. Mondell (R)

Non-voting members 
 . John F. Wilson (D)
 . Robert W. Wilcox (Home Rule), from November 6, 1900
 . Pedro Perea (R)
 . Dennis T. Flynn (R)

Changes in membership
The count below reflects changes from the beginning of the first session of this Congress.

Senate
 Replacements: 7
 Democratic: no net change
 Republican: 1 seat loss
 Populist: 1 seat gain
 Deaths: 3
 Resignations: 1
 Vacancies: 5
 Interim appointments: 2
Total seats with changes: 9

House of Representatives
 Replacements: 21
 Democratic: 5 seat loss
 Republican: 5 seat gain
 Populist: no net change
 Deaths: 12
 Resignations: 7
 Contested election: 3
 New seats: 1
Total seats with changes: 26

Committees

Senate

 United States Senate Select Committee on the Additional Accommodations for the Library of Congress (Select) (Chairman: James H. Berry; Ranking Member: Shelby M. Cullom)
 Agriculture and Forestry (Chairman: Redfield Proctor; Ranking Member: William B. Bate)
 Appropriations (Chairman: William B. Allison; Ranking Member: Francis M. Cockrell)
 Audit and Control the Contingent Expenses of the Senate (Chairman: John P. Jones; Ranking Member: Jacob H. Gallinger)
 Canadian Relations (Chairman: Mark Hanna; Ranking Member: Richard F. Pettigrew)
 Census (Chairman: Thomas H. Carter; Ranking Member: Samuel D. McEnery)
 Civil Service and Retrenchment (Chairman: Lucien Baker; Ranking Member: Horace Chilton)
 Claims (Chairman: Francis E. Warren; Ranking Member: Henry M. Teller)
 Coast and Insular Survey (Chairman: Addison G. Foster; Ranking Member: John T. Morgan)
 Coast Defenses (Chairman: George W. McBride; Ranking Member: Marion Butler)
 Commerce (Chairman: William P. Frye; Ranking Member: George G. Vest)
 Corporations Organized in the District of Columbia (Chairman: Donelson Caffery; Ranking Member: Nelson W. Aldrich)
 Cuban Relations (Chairman: Orville H. Platt; Ranking Member: Henry M. Teller)
 Distributing Public Revenue Among the States (Select)
 District of Columbia (Chairman: James McMillan; Ranking Member: Nelson W. Aldrich)
 Education and Labor (Chairman: James H. Kyle; Ranking Member: Donelson Caffery)
 Engrossed Bills (Chairman: Francis M. Cockrell; Ranking Member: George F. Hoar)
 Enrolled Bills (Chairman: William J. Sewell; Ranking Member: Donelson Caffery)
 Establish a University in the United States (Select) (Chairman: George L. Wellington; Ranking Member: James K. Jones)
 Examine the Several Branches in the Civil Service (Chairman: Jonathan Rose; Ranking Member: Thomas B. Turley)
 Expenditures in Executive Departments
 Finance (Chairman: Nelson W. Aldrich; Ranking Member: John P. Jones)
 Fisheries (Chairman: George C. Perkins; Ranking Member: Marion Butler)
 Five Civilized Tribes of Indians (Select) (Chairman: William B. Bate; Ranking Member: Orville H. Platt)
 Foreign Relations (Chairman: Cushman K. Davis; Ranking Member: John T. Morgan) 
 Forest Reservations and the Protection of Game (Chairman: Albert J. Beveridge; Ranking Member: John T. Morgan)
 Geological Survey (Select) (Chairman: Stephen B. Elkins; Ranking Member: Hernando D. Money)
 Immigration (Chairman: Boies Penrose; Ranking Member: Joseph L. Rawlins)
 Indian Affairs (Chairman: John M. Thurston; Ranking Member: John T. Morgan)
 Indian Depredations (Chairman: William J. Deboe; Ranking Member: William Lindsay) 
 Irrigation and Reclamation (Chairman: Joseph Simon; Ranking Member: William A. Harris)
 Industrial Expositions (Select) (Chairman: Chauncey M. Depew; Ranking Member: George G. Vest)
 Interoceanic Canals (Chairman: John Tyler Morgan; Ranking Member: Joseph R. Hawley)
 Interstate Commerce (Chairman: Shelby M. Cullom; Ranking Member: William Lindsay)
 Judiciary (Chairman: George F. Hoar; Ranking Member: Henry M. Teller) 
 Library (Chairman: George P. Wetmore; Ranking Member: Francis M. Cockrell)
 Manufactures (Chairman: William E. Mason; Ranking Member: William A. Harris)
 Military Affairs (Chairman: Joseph Hawley; Ranking Member: William B. Bate)
 Mines and Mining (Chairman: William M. Stewart; Ranking Member: Benjamin R. Tillman)
 Mississippi River and its Tributaries (Select) (Chairman: Knute Nelson; Ranking Member: William B. Bate)
 National Banks (Select) (Chairman: John Kean; Ranking Member: Horace Chilton)
 Naval Affairs (Chairman: Eugene Hale; Ranking Member: Benjamin R. Tillman)
 Nicaragua Canal (Select)
 Pacific Islands and Puerto Rico (Chairman: Joseph B. Foraker; Ranking Member: Francis M. Cockrell)
 Pacific Railroads (Chairman: John H. Gear; Ranking Member: John T. Morgan)
 Patents (Chairman: Jeter C. Pritchard; Ranking Member: Stephen R. Mallory)
 Pensions (Chairman: Jacob H. Gallinger; Ranking Member: William Lindsay)
 Philippines (Chairman: Henry Cabot Lodge; Ranking Member: Joseph L. Rawlins) 
 Post Office and Post Roads (Chairman: Edward O. Wolcott; Ranking Member: Marion Butler)
 Potomac River Front (Select) (Chairman: Nathan B. Scott; Ranking Member: Thomas S. Martin)
 Printing (Chairman: Thomas C. Platt; Ranking Member: James K. Jones) 
 Private Land Claims (Chairman: Henry M. Teller; Ranking Member: Eugene Hale)
 Privileges and Elections (Chairman: William E. Chandler; Ranking Member: Donelson Caffery)
 Public Buildings and Grounds (Chairman: Charles W. Fairbanks; Ranking Member: George G. Vest)
 Public Health and National Quarantine (Chairman: George G. Vest; Ranking Member: Jacob H. Gallinger)
 Public Lands (Chairman: Henry C. Hansbrough; Ranking Member: James H. Berry)
 Railroads (Chairman: Clarence D. Clark; Ranking Member: Augustus O. Bacon)
 Revision of the Laws (Chairman: Julius C. Burrows; Ranking Member: John W. Daniel)
 Revolutionary Claims (Chairman: William Lindsay; Ranking Member: William J. Deboe)
 Rules (Chairman: John C. Spooner; Ranking Member: Henry M. Teller)
 Tariff Regulation (Select)
 Territories (Chairman: George L. Shoup; Ranking Member: William B. Bate)
 Transportation and Sale of Meat Products (Select) (Chairman: Richard F. Pettigrew; Ranking Member: Edward O. Wolcott)
 Transportation Routes to the Seaboard (Chairman: Joseph V. Quarles; Ranking Member: George Turner)
 Trespassers upon Indian Lands (Chairman: Porter J. McCumber; Ranking Member: N/A)
 Washington City Centennial (Select)
 Whole
 Woman Suffrage (Select) (Chairman: John W. Daniel; Ranking Member: George Frisbie Hoar)

House of Representatives

 Accounts (Chairman: Melville Bull; Ranking Member: Charles L. Bartlett)
 Agriculture (Chairman: James W. Wadsworth; Ranking Member: John S. Williams)
 Alcoholic Liquor Traffic (Chairman: Nehemiah D. Sperry; Ranking Member: Oscar Turner)
 Appropriations (Chairman: Joseph G. Cannon; Ranking Member: Leonidas F. Livingston)
 Banking and Currency (Chairman: Marriott Brosius; Ranking Member: Nicholas N. Cox)
 Claims (Chairman: Joseph V. Graff; Ranking Member: Edward Robb)
 Coinage, Weights and Measures (Chairman: James H. Southard; Ranking Member: Edwin R. Ridgely)
 Disposition of Executive Papers
 District of Columbia (Chairman: Joseph W. Babcock; Ranking Member: Adolph Meyer)
 Education (Chairman: Galusha A. Grow; Ranking Member: David A. De Armond)
 Election of the President, Vice President and Representatives in Congress (Chairman: John B. Corliss; Ranking Member: William W. Rucker)
 Elections No.#1 (Chairman: Robert W. Tayler; Ranking Member: Charles L. Bartlett)
 Elections No.#2 (Chairman: Walter L. Weaver; Ranking Member: James M. Robinson)
 Elections No.#3 (Chairman: William S. Mesick; Ranking Member: Robert W. Miers)
 Enrolled Bills (Chairman: William B. Baker; Ranking Member: James T. Lloyd)
 Expenditures in the Agriculture Department (Chairman: Charles W. Gillet; Ranking Member: James W. Ryan)
 Expenditures in the Interior Department (Chairman: Charles Curtis; Ranking Member: Thomas C. Catchings)
 Expenditures in the Justice Department (Chairman: Jonathan P. Dolliver; Ranking Member: Daniel J. Riordan)
 Expenditures in the Navy Department (Chairman: James F. Stewart; Ranking Member: Stanyarne Wilson)
 Expenditures in the Post Office Department (Chairman: Irving P. Wanger; Ranking Member: Edward Robb)
 Expenditures in the State Department (Chairman: William A. Smith; Ranking Member: Rufus E. Lester)
 Expenditures in the Treasury Department (Chairman: Robert G. Cousins; Ranking Member: William L. Terry)
 Expenditures in the War Department (Chairman: William W. Grout; Ranking Member: William L. Stark)
 Expenditures on Public Buildings 
 Foreign Affairs (Chairman: Robert R. Hitt; Ranking Member: Hugh A. Dinsmore)
 Immigration and Naturalization (Chairman: William B. Shattuc; Ranking Member: Peter J. Otey)
 Indian Affairs (Chairman: James S. Sherman; Ranking Member: John S. Little)
 Insular Affairs (Chairman: Henry A. Cooper; Ranking Member: William A. Jones)
 Interstate and Foreign Commerce (Chairman: William P. Hepburn; Ranking Member: William McAleer)
 Invalid Pensions (Chairman: Cyrus A. Sulloway; Ranking Member: Robert W. Miers)
 Irrigation of Arid Lands (Chairman: Thomas H. Tongue; Ranking Member: John F. Shafroth)
 Judiciary (Chairman: George W. Ray; Ranking Member: William L. Terry) 
 Labor (Chairman: John J. Gardner; Ranking Member: W. Jasper Talbert)
 Levees and Improvements of the Mississippi River (Chairman: Richard Bartholdt; Ranking Member: John M. Allen)
 Library (Chairman: Alfred C. Harmer; Ranking Member: Amos J. Cummings)
 Manufactures (Chairman: George W. Faris; Ranking Member: Willard D. Vandiver)
 Merchant Marine and Fisheries (Chairman: Charles H. Grosvenor; Ranking Member: John F. Fitzgerald)
 Mileage (Chairman: John A. Barham; Ranking Member: Samuel B. Cooper)
 Military Affairs (Chairman: John A.T. Hull; Ranking Member: William Sulzer)
 Militia (Chairman: Charles Dick; Ranking Member: William L. Stark)
 Mines and Mining (Chairman: Rousseau O. Crump; Ranking Member: Farish C. Tate)
 Naval Affairs (Chairman: Charles A. Boutelle; Ranking Member: Amos J. Cummings)
 Pacific Railroads (Chairman: H. Henry Powers; Ranking Member: James L. Slayden)
 Patents (Chairman: Winfield S. Kerr; Ranking Member: William Sulzer)
 Pensions (Chairman: Henry C. Loudenslager; Ranking Member: Jesse F. Stallings)
 Post Office and Post Roads (Chairman: Eugene F. Loud; Ranking Member: Claude A. Swanson)
 Printing (Chairman: Joel P. Heatwole; Ranking Member: Farish C. Tate)
 Private Land Claims (Chairman: George W. Smith; Ranking Member: William A. Jones)
 Public Buildings and Grounds (Chairman: David H. Mercer; Ranking Member: John H. Bankhead)
 Public Lands (Chairman: John F. Lacey; Ranking Member: John F. Shafroth)
 Railways and Canals (Chairman: Charles A. Chickering; Ranking Member: Reese C. De Graffenreid)
 Reform in the Civil Service (Chairman: Frederick H. Gillett; Ranking Member: Samuel M. Robertson)
 Revision of Laws (Chairman: Vespasian Warner; Ranking Member: James T. Lloyd)
 Rivers and Harbors (Chairman: Theodore E. Burton; Ranking Member: Thomas C. Catchings)
 Rules (Chairman: John Dalzell; Ranking Member: James D. Richardson) 
 Standards of Official Conduct
 Territories (Chairman: William S. Knox; Ranking Member: William McAleer)
 Ventilation and Acoustics (Chairman: George W. Prince; Ranking Member: David H. Smith)
 War Claims (Chairman: Thaddeus M. Mahon; Ranking Member: Patrick Henry)
 Ways and Means (Chairman: Sereno E. Payne; Ranking Member: James D. Richardson)
 Whole

Joint committees
 Conditions of Indian Tribes (Special)
 Disposition of (Useless) Executive Papers
 The Library
 Printing

Caucuses
 Democratic (House)
 Democratic (Senate)

Employees

Legislative branch agency directors
 Architect of the Capitol: Edward Clark
 Librarian of Congress: John Russell Young, until 1899
 Herbert Putnam, from 1899
 Public Printer of the United States: Francis W. Palmer

Senate
 Chaplain: William H. Millburn (Methodist)
 Secretary: William Ruffin Cox, until February 1, 1900
 Charles G. Bennett, elected February 1, 1900
 Librarian: Alonzo M. Church
 Sergeant at Arms: Richard J. Bright, until February 1, 1900
 Daniel M. Ransdell, elected February 1, 1900

House of Representatives
 Chaplain: Henry N. Couden (Universalist)
 Clerk: Alexander McDowell
 Clerk at the Speaker's Table:  Asher C. Hinds
 Doorkeeper: William J. Glenn
 Postmaster: Joseph C. McElroy
 Reading Clerks: E.L. Sampson (D) and Dennis E. Alward (R)
 Sergeant at Arms: Benjamin F. Russell, until December 4, 1899
 Henry Casson, from December 4, 1899

See also 
 1898 United States elections (elections leading to this Congress)
 1898–99 United States Senate elections
 1898 United States House of Representatives elections
 1900 United States elections (elections during this Congress, leading to the next Congress)
 1900 United States presidential election
 1900–01 United States Senate elections
 1900 United States House of Representatives elections

References

External links
 Statutes at Large, 1789-1875
 Biographical Directory of the U.S. Congress
 U.S. House of Representatives: Congressional History 
 U.S. Senate: Statistics and Lists